The LiteWing Aircraft LiteWing, also called the Lite Wing Trike, is an American ultralight trike that was designed and produced by LiteWing Aircraft of Caryville, Tennessee in the late 1990s. The aircraft was supplied as a kit for amateur construction.

Design and development
It features a  cable-braced hang glider-style high-wing, weight-shift controls, a single-seat, open cockpit with a three-piece fiberglass cockpit fairing, tricycle landing gear with wheel pants and a single engine in pusher configuration.

The aircraft is made from welded and bolted 6061-T6 aluminum tubing, with its NorthWing 157  wing covered in Dacron sailcloth. Its  span wing is supported by a single tube-type kingpost and uses an "A" frame control bar. The engine factory supplied was the  Rotax 447 twin cylinder, two-stroke, air-cooled aircraft engine. Brakes on the main wheels are standard equipment.

Twenty examples had been completed and flown by February 2000.

Specifications (LiteWing)

References

1990s United States ultralight aircraft
Single-engined pusher aircraft
Ultralight trikes
LiteWing Aircraft aircraft